Ampol Saranont (born 1933) is a Thai basketball player. He competed in the men's tournament at the 1956 Summer Olympics.

References

1933 births
Living people
Ampol Saranont
Ampol Saranont
Basketball players at the 1956 Summer Olympics
Place of birth missing (living people)